Heliolonche celeris is a moth in the family Noctuidae. It is found in California.

Subspecies
Heliolonche celeris celeris
Heliolonche celeris melicleptrioides

External links
Images

C
Endemic fauna of California
Moths of North America
Fauna without expected TNC conservation status